Zdice is a town in Beroun District in the Central Bohemian Region of the Czech Republic. It has about 4,000 inhabitants.

Administrative parts
Villages of Černín and Knížkovice are administrative parts of Zdice.

Geography
It lies mostly in the Hořovice Uplands, including the built-up area. The town is situated at the confluence of the Litavka River and the Červený Stream.

History
The first written mention of Zdice is from 1148. It was probably founded in 1039. Until 1302, it was owned by the bishopric in Prague, then it was joined to the town of Beroun. In 1357, the village was merged with the newly established Karlštejn estate, owned by the royal chamber. During the rule of King Sigismund, Zdice was annexed to the Točník estate, to which it belonged until 1607. From 1607 until the establishment of an independent municipal administration after 1848, the village belonged to the Králův Dvůr estate.

In the second half of the 19th century, Zdice was industrialised and the population grew. In 1872, Zdice was promoted to a market town. In 1994, it became a town.

Until 1918, the town was part of Austria-Hungary (Austrian side after the compromise of 1867), in the Hořovice district, one of the 94 Bezirkshauptmannschaften (district administrative authorities) in Bohemia.

Demographics

Transport
The D5 motorway from Prague to Plzeň and the border with Germany passes through the town.

Sights

The Church of the Nativity of the Virgin Mary was built in the Baroque style in 1747–1749. It replaced an old Gothic church.

A valuable building is the town hall. It is a historical house, rebuilt into its current Neoclassical form in the second half of the 18th century. Gothic barrel vaults are preserved in the basement.

Notable people
Josef Vorel (1801–1874), priest and composer

References

External links

Cities and towns in the Czech Republic
Populated places in the Beroun District